Timpoong and Hibok-Hibok Natural Monument is a Philippine natural monument located in Northern Mindanao on the island of Camiguin. It encompasses two scenic volcanoes in the Camiguin Mindanao range that span the core of Camiguin: Mount Mambajao, which includes Mount Timpoong, its highest peak, and Mount Catarman, which includes Mount Hibok-Hibok, the island's only currently active volcano. Established in 2004 through Proclamation No. 570 issued by President Gloria Arroyo, the natural monument is an important watershed containing the only remaining rainforest on Camiguin. It supports a variety of endemic flora and fauna and is also noted for its waterfalls, rivers and springs.

During the 13th ASEAN Ministerial Meeting on the Environment in 2015, the Timpoong and Hibok-Hibok monument was formally declared an ASEAN Heritage Park.

Description

The  protected area stretches along the central and western interior of the island of Camiguin. It also includes a buffer zone of  surrounding Mount Hibok-Hibok and  surrounding Mount Timpoong, and extends into four of the five municipalities on the island: Mambajao, Catarman, Mahinog and Sagay.

Mambajao is the central and largest of the island's three volcanic mountains (the others being Mount Catarman and Mount Sagay, also known as Mount Guinsiliban). It has flank vents located on Campana Hill and Minokol Hill.

Located just northwest of Mambajao is Mount Catarman. Its highest peak is Mount Hibok-Hibok which measures  in elevation and is classified as an active stratovolcano. Mount Tres Marias and Mount Vulcan Daan (Old Volcano) are Mount Catarman's other peaks.

The protected area is also noted for its hydrological features, many of which are popular among tourists and hikers. They include waterfalls such as the Katibawasan, Binangawan and Tuasan Falls, cold and hot springs like those of Ardent and Santo Niño, and rivers such as Sagay and Binangawan rivers. It is also the location of the Hibok-Hibok Volcano Observatory of the Philippine Institute of Volcanology and Seismology.

Flora and fauna
The natural monument was established for the conservation of endangered and endemic fauna that live within those forests. They include one bird species and two mammals that can only be found in Camiguin: the Camiguin hanging parrot, and the Camiguin forest mouse and Camiguin forest rat. Other fauna include the Camiguin hawk-owl, writhed hornbill, Mindanao shrew, Camiguin narrow-mouthed frog, big-eyed frog and small rufous horseshoe bat.

Its vegetation consists of tropical plants endemic to Camiguin such as  Miguelia reticulata, Medinilla multiflora, Memecylon subcaudatum, Syzygium camiguense, Coelogyne confusa and Goodyera ramosii.

References

Natural monuments of the Philippines
Geography of Camiguin
Protected areas established in 2004
2004 establishments in the Philippines
ASEAN heritage parks